Michael Mulcahy may refer to:

Michael Mulcahy (politician) (born 1960), former Irish Fianna Fáil politician
Michael Mulcahy (painter) (born 1952), Irish expressionist painter